David Lewis (born August 4, 1976) is a Canadian actor, best known for his roles in Hope Island, Icarus, White Chicks, A Fairly Odd Movie: Grow Up, Timmy Turner, Dirk Gently's Holistic Detective Agency, and Child's Play.

Career
Lewis is best known for playing Kevin Mitchum on the PAX series Hope Island. He played Walt Lawson in the 1999 film Lake Placid. He also worked in The Butterfly Effect 2. Lewis played Richard Allen on CBS's Harper's Island. In 2010, he played Mr. Graham in Icarus. David has had a role in almost 100 movies and shows. In 2005, he appeared on Criminal Minds. He starred in Shoes Off!, which was a Genie Award nominee for Best Live Action Short Drama in 1998. He also played Mr. Denzel Crocker in the 2011 television film A Fairly Odd Movie: Grow Up, Timmy Turner, the 2012 TV movie, A Fairly Odd Christmas, and the 2014 TV movie, A Fairly Odd Summer.

He was cast in Dirk Gently's Holistic Detective Agency in 2018 as FBI Agent Weedle. In 2019, Lewis was cast in the horror film Child's Play as Shane, a character who is depicted as mean and abusive towards his girlfriend's son Andy (Gabriel Bateman). He was interviewed by Dread Central about his role in the film. In 2015, Lewis has been awarded a Leo award for the Best Performance by a Male in a Web Series.

Personal life
Lewis revealed in his 2019 interview that he has children, including at least one son.

Filmography

Film

Television

References

External links
 

1976 births
Living people
Canadian male film actors
Place of birth missing (living people)